The Goodwin (Sheffield) Foursomes Tournament was a professional golf tournament played in the Sheffield area of England. The event was held from 1952 to 1954 and had total prize money of £3,000. The winning finalists shared £500 with £300 to the runners-up. The event was sponsored by Sir Stuart Goodwin, a Yorkshire steel industrialist.

A total of 64 players qualified for the final stage through a regional system of 36-hole individual stroke-play. These 64 were drawn into 32 pairs for the final knockout stage. There were four rounds of 18-hole match-play foursomes, followed by a 36-hole final on the third day.

Winners

References

Golf tournaments in England